Bodufolhudhoo (Dhivehi: ބޮޑުފޮޅުދޫ) is one of the inhabited islands of Alif Alif Atoll in the Republic of Maldives.

Geography
Bodufolhudhoo is a small island located in the central area of North Ari Atoll and surrounded by many famous tourist resorts, including Nika Island Resort, Velidoo and Gangehi.

Ecology
Bodufolhudhoo is the first island in the Maldives to ban single-use plastic bags.

Demography

Economy

Bodufolhudhoo's economy has been based mostly on fishing until the early 1990s. The current economy is mainly supported by people working in the tourism industry.

There are a few tourist shops on the island for the guests who come island hopping from nearby resorts.

Bodufolhudhoo now boasts over five operating guesthouses with many guest houses under development. The island council has designated a private beach (Sunset beach) specifically for the visiting tourists.

Employment is predominantly provided by nearby resorts, however island employment may also be found in education, island council, health centre, utilities, shops, restaurants and guesthouses.

Healthcare
There is a health centre in the island to provide basic health care service to the community. The health centre has a medical officer and two registered nurses and nearly 15 staff members.

Transport

As Bodufolhudhoo is an island surrounded by sea, transport is mainly water based. There are speed boats and normal boats that people use for transport between the islands. Larger vessels are used to travel to and from the capital Male' and for faster transport residents use a seaplane service from the nearby resorts. Fishermen will use purpose-built fishing vessels to catch fish from the open sea. The government ferry system was introduced in 2012, whereby boats became available to travel between the islands at a cheaper fare.

People mostly walk on the island, but may also use bicycles and motorbikes to travel from one place to another. Wheelbarrow "gaadiyaa" in different sizes are used to transport heavy materials.

In the early 1990s a nationwide helicopter service was provided by Hummingbird. To this day the helipad used by Hummingbird exists in Bodufolhudhoo.

References

http://www.worldtravelguide.net/maldives/weather-climate-geography

External links
https://web.archive.org/web/20180924104342/http://bodufolhudhoo.com/ (does not appear operational)

Islands of the Maldives
Alif Alif Atoll